Anthiro is a mountain village in the western part of the Karditsa regional unit, Greece.  Anthiro is the seat of the municipality of Argithea.  Anthiro had a population of 462 in 2011.  Anthiro is located 20 km southwest of Mouzaki, 40 km west of Karditsa, and 19 km southwest of Pyli.

Its residents are based in agriculture which includes honey production. There is a museum in the village.  Near the village are the Korakos bridge, built in the 12th century, and the Kleftovrysi and Stavro bridges.

Population

External links
 Anthiro on GTP Travel Pages

See also

List of settlements in the Karditsa regional unit

References

Populated places in Karditsa (regional unit)